Room to Read is a global non-profit organization headquartered in San Francisco, California. The organization focuses on working in collaboration with local communities, partner organizations and governments to improve literacy and gender equality in education.

Room to Read has reached 23 million children and has worked in 20 countries.

History 
Room to Read was co-founded and launched by John Wood, Erin Keown Ganju and Dinesh Shrestha in 1999 after Wood visited several local schools in Nepal. He observed the teachers' and students' enthusiasm and lack of resources, which lead him to quit his job and build a global team to create sustainable programs that help solve their education challenges

Wood and Shrestha worked with rural communities to build schools called School Room and established libraries called Reading Room. They later expanded beyond libraries, to begin the Girls' Education program in 2000, which focuses on young girls and provides a long-term commitment to their education.

In 2001, Ganju launched Room to Read in Vietnam. Since then, Room to Read's operations have expanded to include 20 countries.

Programs
Room to Read's Literacy Program supports literacy development for primary school students. The organization works with local authors and illustrators to create and distribute children's books. It also introduced an online learning platform called Literacy Cloud during the COVID-19 pandemic.  

Through its Girls' Education Program, Room to Read supports girls with resources, mentorship and a life skills curriculum that helps them overcome challenges to education.

Impact
Since its inception in 2000, Room to Read has reached 32 million children in underserved communities around the world:

 49,000 schools in 29 countries have been benefitted from Room to Read programs.
 Approximately 34 million children's books have been distributed, including more than 4,777 original and adapted Room to Read book titles
 3.5 million books have been checked out.
 200,000 teachers and librarians have been trained in literacy and reading best practices
 More than 2.8 million girls are supported by Room to Read's Girls' Education Program; 95% of girls who remained in the program advanced to the next grade
 More than 3 million girls have benefitted from the Girl's Education Program since the onset of the COVID-19 pandemic.

Awards and recognition 
 Skoll Foundation: Award for Social Entrepreneurship (2004–2013)
 Academy for Educational Development: Breakthrough Ideas in Education (2007)
 Fast Company / Monitor Group: Social Capitalist Award (2004–2008)
 Charity Navigator: 14 four-star ratings (2005–2017, 2019)
 American Library Association: Presidential Citation (2008) 
 UNESCO Confucius Prize for Literacy: 2011
 Cambodia Ministry of Education: Royal Medal of Munisaraphorn Mahasereaywat (2013)
 World's Children's Prize, Honorary Award Laureate (2014)
 American University School of International Service: Ten Innovative NGOs in Education (2014) 
 Library of Congress Literacy Award: Special Response Award (2020); David M. Rubenstein Prize (2014)

References

External links 
 

Educational charities based in the United States
Charities based in California
International educational charities
Development charities based in the United States
Organizations established in 2000
2000 establishments in the United States
Organizations promoting literacy